The Oxygen Project is a project created to give a visual refresh to KDE Plasma Workspaces.

It consists of a set of computer icons, a window decoration for KWin, widget toolkit themes for GTK and Qt, two themes for Plasma Workspaces, and a TrueType font family.

The Oxygen theme set was used by default for Plasma Workspaces in most Linux distributions, like Fedora, Kubuntu, and openSUSE.

History 
The original purpose was to create a new set of icons but expanded to include a new theme, which included a new cursor, widget and window theme, and sounds. It represents a break with the cartoonish look of previous K Desktop Environment 3 graphics and iconsets, adopting a more photo-realistic style. One of the overall goals of Oxygen was to provide a nice looking desktop that did not distract the user, so the icons and themes use a desaturated color palette. The name Oxygen came from a joke between the developers that they wanted to ”bring a breath of fresh air to the desktop”.

Oxygen Fonts 

On  the Oxygen Font sub-project was announced. The first release – version 0.1 – was done a month later. The 0.2 release from  included refinements and added a monospace font.

Standardization 
The Oxygen Project aims to offer standard icons, guidelines and a style guide. It builds on  the freedesktop.org Standard Icon Naming Specification and Standard Icon Theme, allowing consistency across applications. There is an ongoing effort for supporting these specifications in different desktops, and by different icon sets and themes, such as the Tango Desktop Project.

People 
Nuno Pinheiro (current coordinator)
David Vignoni (founder)
Kenneth Wimer (founder)

See also 

Tango Desktop Project – developers of a public domain icon set
Breeze Project – breeze, breeze Debian package

References 

Computer icons
Free software projects
KDE
KDE Platform